Eleuterio Antón (born 30 March 1950) is a Spanish long-distance runner. He competed in the marathon at the 1980 Summer Olympics.

He finished 3rd in Amsterdam in 1982 with 2h14:14 and obtained so the Spanish record. He developed his career in helping people with disabilities working for ONCE then for FEDC. Currently he is giving support to FEDDF. 

He continues advocating for athletics and adaptive sports at global level.

Marcas campeonato de España de Maratón

Articles

References

External links
 

1950 births
Living people
Athletes (track and field) at the 1980 Summer Olympics
Spanish male long-distance runners
Spanish male marathon runners
Olympic athletes of Spain